The 10th Terek-Dagestan Army was a field army of the Red Army during the Russian Civil War which was formed on the basis of the Terek-Dagestan group of forces  between March 7 and May 29, 1921. The troops became then part of the North Caucasus Military District.

History
The army was formed to suppress the insurrection under the leadership of Nazhmudin Gotsinsky.
Nazhmudin Gotsinsky (1859 - 1925) was Chairman (Mufti) of the Spiritual Council of the Union of United Highlanders of the North Caucasus and Dagestan. He was elected Imam of the North Caucasus Highlanders and became one of the leaders of the counter-revolutionary movement in Dagestan between 1917-1921. He was of Avar nationality.

Commanders 
 Mikhail Levandovsky (April 7 - April 18, 1921)
 I.F. Sharskov (acting, April 18-26, 1921)
 V.N. Chernyshov (April 26 - May 11, 1921)
 Georgy Armaderov (May 11-29, 1921)

Soviet field armies in the Russian Civil War
Military units and formations established in 1921
Military units and formations disestablished in 1921